Harrisville may refer to the following places:

Australia
 Harrisville, Queensland, a town and locality in the Scenic Rim Region

New Zealand
 Harrisville, New Zealand

United States
 Harrisville, Indiana
 Harrisville, Maryland
 Harrisville, Michigan
 Harrisville, Mississippi
 Harrisville, New Hampshire
 Harrisville, New York
 Harrisville, Ohio
 Harrisville, Pennsylvania
 Harrisville, Rhode Island
 Harrisville, Utah
 Harrisville, West Virginia
 Harrisville, Wisconsin
 Harrisville Township, Medina County, Ohio
 Harrisville Township, Michigan

See also 
 Harris (disambiguation)
 Harrisburg (disambiguation)
 Harrison (disambiguation)